Steven Goertzen (born May 26, 1984) is a Canadian-born former professional ice hockey winger who played in the National Hockey League for the Columbus Blue Jackets, Phoenix Coyotes and the Carolina Hurricanes.

Playing career
Born in Stony Plain, Alberta, Goertzen started his junior hockey career with the tier II St. Albert Saints of the Alberta Junior Hockey League, but soon caught on with the Western Hockey League's Seattle Thunderbirds. After his first season with Seattle, Goertzen was selected 225th overall in the 2002 NHL Entry Draft by the Columbus Blue Jackets, and after three seasons and 81 points with the Thunderbirds, Goertzen moved to the professional ranks.

So far, Goertzen's career has been marked by low point totals, with his best professional season being in 2004–05 when he spread twelve points out between the AHL and ECHL. However, in the 2005–06 NHL season, Goertzen made his NHL debut with Columbus, and in thirty-nine games failed to record a point before being returned to the American Hockey League.

He failed to score a point in his first 48 career games. In his 49th career game, as a member of the Phoenix Coyotes, he scored his first two career points, both assists, in a 6-3 loss to the Edmonton Oilers.

On July 8, 2009 he signed as an unrestricted free agent with the Carolina Hurricanes. On November 10, 2010 he signed a one-year contract with the Springfield Falcons, for whom he had been playing on a professional tryout (PTO) contract.

On July 26, 2012 it was announced that Goertzen had signed for the Sheffield Steelers in the U.K. Elite Ice Hockey League. After two seasons, he switched to the Coventry Blaze. At the conclusion of the 2014–15 season with the Blaze on June 28, 2015, Goertzen announced his retirement from professional hockey. Currently playing division 3 men's hockey in Edmonton Alberta (beer league).

Career statistics

References

External links

1984 births
Albany River Rats players
BK Mladá Boleslav players
Carolina Hurricanes players
Columbus Blue Jackets draft picks
Columbus Blue Jackets players
Coventry Blaze players
Dayton Bombers players
Ice hockey people from Alberta
Living people
People from Parkland County
Phoenix Coyotes players
San Antonio Rampage players
Seattle Thunderbirds players
Sheffield Steelers players
Canadian expatriate ice hockey players in the United States
Springfield Falcons players
Syracuse Crunch players
Canadian ice hockey right wingers
Canadian expatriate ice hockey players in the Czech Republic
Canadian expatriate ice hockey players in England